Tuyabuguz Reservoir, also known as the Tashmore or Tashkentskoye more is artificial lake located in Tashkent Province,  south of Tashkent, Uzbekistan. The urban settlement of Tuyaboʻgʻiz is situated on the dam's northern end. The reservoir provides irrigation for Tashkent Province.

References

External links
 Tuyabuguz Reservoir, Geographic.org

Tuyabuguz